The stylopharyngeal branch of glossopharyngeal nerve is distributed to the Stylopharyngeus.

References 

Glossopharyngeal nerve